Murfreesboro Historic District is a national historic district located at Murfreesboro, Hertford County, North Carolina.  The district encompasses nine contributing buildings in the oldest section of the city of Murfreesboro. The buildings include notable examples of Greek Revival style architecture. They are the William Rea Store (c. 1790); John Wheeler House (c. 1800) birthplace of John H. Wheeler (1806-1882) and later home of Congressman Jesse Johnson Yeates (1829-1892); Myrick House (c. 1810); Melrose (c. 1810) home of Congressman William H. Murfree (1781 – 1827); The Hertford Academy (c. 1810); Roberts-Vaughan House (c. 1810); Dr. Isaac Pipkin House (c. 1825); Rose Bower (c. 1830); and the Walter Reed House (c. 1845) childhood home of Walter Reed.

It was listed on the National Register of Historic Places in 1971.

References

Historic districts on the National Register of Historic Places in North Carolina
Greek Revival architecture in North Carolina
Buildings and structures in Murfreesboro, North Carolina
National Register of Historic Places in Hertford County, North Carolina